Rob Mulders (7 April 1967 – 29 January 1998) was a Dutch road racing cyclist, who was a professional from 1991 to 1996. He twice rode the Tour de France, in 1993 and 1994. Born in Well, Limburg, Mulders' biggest success was winning Veenendaal–Veenendaal in 1993. Five years later he died in a car crash near Apeldoorn.

Major results

1989
 2nd Dorpenomloop Rucphen
1990
 2nd Ronde van Drenthe
 2nd Omloop der Kempen
 3rd Hel van het Mergelland
 3rd Ster van Zwolle
1991
 1st Omloop der Kempen
 1st Stage 9 Olympia's Tour
 2nd Rund um Köln
 2nd Hel van het Mergelland
 2nd Ronde van Noord-Holland
1992
 8th Overall Étoile de Bessèges
 10th Grote Prijs Jef Scherens
1993
 1st Veenendaal–Veenendaal
 1st Circuit des Frontières
 1st Stage 6 Vuelta a Asturias

Grand Tour general classification results timeline

References

External links

1967 births
1998 deaths
Dutch male cyclists
People from Bergen, Limburg
Road incident deaths in the Netherlands
Cyclists from Limburg (Netherlands)